Foreign relations exist between Austria and the United Kingdom, and have been positive and friendly since Austrian independence in 1955. Both nations are members of the Council of Europe. The two nations share close economic and technological ties, and cooperate in a variety of fields, particularly when the UK was a member of the European Union and also more recently in condemning Russia's invasion of Ukraine. They have also agreed to cooperate on mutual interests over matters involving security in the Balkans, including regarding Kosovo, Albania and Serbia and furthermore to work together on countering subversive Russian activity in the region.

History
Relations between the Austrian Empire and England were established in the Middle Ages although formal relations began only in 1799. The two nations were enemies during the First World War and the Second World War. The United Kingdom and Austria now have warm relations.

The President of Austria, Franz Jonas, paid a state visit to the United Kingdom in May 1966.
In May 1969, HM Queen Elizabeth II of the United Kingdom paid a state visit to Austria.

According to the 2001 UK Census, some 20,000 Austrian born people were living in the UK, which is actually a drop of around 5% from 1991, despite this there are also large but unknown numbers of British born people of Austrian descent.

Diplomacy
The Austrian ambassador to the United Kingdom is Michael Zimmermann, he took up his post in August 2018. The British ambassador to Austria is  who took up her post in September 2021.

Resident diplomatic missions 
 Austria has an embassy in London.
 United Kingdom has an embassy in Vienna.

See also 
 Foreign relations of Austria 
 Foreign relations of the United Kingdom
 Austrians in the United Kingdom
 Britishs in Austria
 Anglo-Austrian Alliance, a historic military alliance between the states that existed between 1731 and 1756
 United Kingdom–European Union relations

References

 
Bilateral relations of the United Kingdom
United Kingdom